Cham Bank is the first Islamic bank to be established in Syria. It started operations in 2007. The Bank's operations and activities are supervised by the Central Bank of Syria.

Objectives of the bank 

Cham Bank works to achieve an increase in the growth of returns, as this benefits customers and shareholders, as it works to ensure the safety and development of the banking system through the application of effective banking supervision and contribute to strengthening the base of deposits and investing them in various economic sectors under the frameworks of Islamic Sharia, and providing advanced banking services, products and facilities, and marketing it with high quality in accordance with the principles of Islamic Sharia for all customers, individuals and institutions that meet their needs and exceed their expectations.

Board of Directors
The Board of Directors consists of the following persons:
 Ali Yousef Al -Awadi, Chairman of the Board

 Ahmed Nabil Muhammad Rafiq Al -Kuzbari, Vice-Chairman of the Board

 Tariq Farid Al -Othman, Member

 Eng. Riad Ali Deeb, Member

 Dr. Ali Mahran Khaunda, Member 

 Luay Abdel Halim Al -Asar, Member 

 Mubarak Al-Tayyeb Al-Amin, Member

Shariah Committee
Beside the Board of Directors, it has the Islamic Committee which supervises and audits the implementation of Islamic activities according to the Quran.  The Islamic committee members are approved by the general assembly.

Members

1. Dr. Ahmed Mohamed Amin Hassan - Chairman of the Sharia Supervisory Board and Executive Member of the Authority 

2. Abd al-Salam Abd al-Moneim Muhammadah - Vice-Chairman of the Shari'a Supervisory Board

3. Abdul Bari Muhammad Mishaal - Member of the Shariah Supervisory Board

Owners
The major shareholder of the bank is The Commercial Bank of Kuwait which is the second largest bank in Kuwait.

Branches
The bank has branches in Damascus, Aleppo, Hama, Homs, Lattakia, Tartous and Daraa.

See also
Economy of Syria
Banking in Syria
List of banks in Syria

References

External links

Banks of Syria
Banks established in 2006
Islamic banks
Companies based in Damascus